Franco Cuter (29 July 1940 – 28 September 2019) was a Brazilian Roman Catholic bishop.

Cuter was born in Italy and was ordained to the priesthood in 1966. He served as bishop of the Roman Catholic Diocese of Grajaú, Brazil.

Notes

1940 births
2019 deaths
21st-century Roman Catholic bishops in Brazil
Italian Roman Catholic bishops in South America
Italian emigrants to Brazil
Roman Catholic bishops of Grajaú